Albany Convict Gaol also known as the Old Gaol is a restored gaol that operates as a museum in Albany, Western Australia.

Description
Buildings within the gaol include the Great Hall, the warders' quarters and the cells. They are arranged around a central courtyard with a hiring depot located in the centre. The entire prison area is surrounded by  stone walls studded with glass from broken bottles.

History
The gaol was established in 1852 for imperial convicts transported to Albany as skilled labourers. It initially consisted of a cell block for convicted men and quarters for the warden. The gaol was built with rehabilitation as a key principle and served not only to house inmates but as a hiring depot. Convicts who were sentenced to transportation from England from between 1850 and 1868 often served their time in the gaol. Many of the convicts arriving had their ticket of leave and were hired to work by the free settlers. Many worked on building the town jetty, manning the pilot boat and building the road to Perth.

The gaol was extended in 1873 and became a public prison, with other buildings on the site being converted to housing for the town magistrates. Aboriginal prisoners were moved into the prison as a result of the increasing number of escapes from the town prison in Lawley Park.

In 1875, the Great Hall, the women's cells and additional quarters for the warden were built.

The gaol was last used in the 1930s during the Great Depression as a police lock-up. By 1941 the goal was put up for sale by the Public Works Department as it was declared unfit for habitation. It remained in a state of disrepair, but was restored between 1989 and 1996 to become a museum. In 2007, late night ghost tours of the gaol started.

See also 
 List of reportedly haunted locations
 List of convict ship voyages to Western Australia
 List of places on the State Register of Heritage Places in the City of Albany

References

Museums in Western Australia
1852 establishments in Australia
Prison museums in Australia
Defunct prisons in Western Australia
Heritage places in Albany, Western Australia
Convictism in Western Australia
State Register of Heritage Places in the City of Albany